Theo Markelis  (born 24 June 1992) is an Australian footballer who is currently playing for Hume City.

Career

Club career
Whilst in Australia he played for Green Gully SC. In 2007, at the age of 15 he went to Spain where he was offered a contract by Valencia CF to play in the youth team, and averaged 15 goals per season. He later moved to Serie B side Vicenza for the start of the 2010–11, before returning to Australia.

Melbourne Victory
On 2 July 2012, it was confirmed that Markelis had signed a two-year deal with Melbourne Victory after impressing coach Ange Postecoglou.

Markelis was released from Melbourne Victory on 31 July 2013.

Return to Spain
In October 2013, Theo Markelis signed with Segunda B Spanish side, Racing de Santander but was not liked by his manager Paco Fernandez and did not make an appearance for the first team. In January 2014 the player was released and he signed for Hércules CF B.
Estuvo a prueba, y como era más malo que la carne de pescuezo, salió a los pocos días.

Move to Greece
On 3 September 2014, the Greek Superleague club Veria announced the signing of Theo.

Return to Melbourne
On 1 May 2015, Theo Markelis signed for Hume City in the mid season transfer window of the National Premier Leagues Victoria after failing to break into the first team with Greek Superleague club Veria.

References

External links
 Melbourne Victory profile
 
 Theo Marcels Interview

1992 births
Living people
Australian expatriate sportspeople in Spain
Australian people of Greek descent
Australian soccer players
Australian expatriate soccer players
A-League Men players
Melbourne Victory FC players
Association football midfielders
Racing de Santander players
Hércules CF B players
Veria F.C. players
Hume City FC players
Super League Greece players
Expatriate footballers in Spain
Australian expatriate sportspeople in Greece
Australian expatriate sportspeople in Italy
Expatriate footballers in Greece
L.R. Vicenza players
Expatriate footballers in Italy
Australia youth international soccer players
Soccer players from Melbourne